Carlo Chiappano (16 March 1941 – 7 July 1982) was an Italian racing cyclist. He won stage 10 of the 1969 Giro d'Italia. He also won the 1969 Tirreno–Adriatico. He rode in nine editions of the Giro d'Italia, as well as three editions of the Tour de France.

After retiring from cycling in 1972, he went on to work as a directeur sportif for several different teams until his death in a car accident in 1982.

Major results
1963
 2nd Milano–Torino
1964
 10th Overall Giro di Sardegna
1965
 Giro d'Italia
Held  after Stage 2
 2nd GP Cemab
1966
 2nd Overall Tour de Suisse
1st Stage 2
1968
 7th Trofeo Masferrer
1969
 1st  Overall Tirreno–Adriatico
 1st Stage 10 Giro d'Italia

References

External links
 

1941 births
1982 deaths
Italian male cyclists
Italian Giro d'Italia stage winners
Road incident deaths in Italy
Cyclists from the Province of Pavia
Directeur sportifs
Tour de Suisse stage winners